"Siren" is a single released by Nana Kitade under the pseudonym Ruby Gloom. The title track "Siren" is being used as the theme song for the Japanese release of the Canadian animated series Ruby Gloom. The limited edition of this single comes with a DVD. The single was produced by former Megadeth guitarist, Marty Friedman, who also produced her reworks of "Kesenai Tsumi", and Alice From her "Berry Berry Singles" Album.

Video information
The video features Nana Kitade dressed as the animated character Ruby Gloom performing with other characters from the series.

Note that the above stated video IS NOT the one on the DVD however.  The above-mentioned video is what has been typically shown as a music video, on music channels, and is a shortened version of the song Siren.

The DVD included in the limited release CD+DVD set has a full length version of the song, with animated scenes from the TV series put together as a music video. (SECL 636)

Track listings
CD
 Siren (サイレン)
 My Treasure
 Siren: Instrumental
 My Treasure: Instrumental

DVD
 Siren (music video)
 Siren (Interview)

Charts

2008 singles
Nana Kitade songs
Songs written by Nana Kitade
2008 songs
Sony Music Entertainment Japan singles